Płaczki may refer to the following places:
Płaczki, Greater Poland Voivodeship (west-central Poland)
Płaczki, Łódź Voivodeship (central Poland)
Płaczki, Silesian Voivodeship (south Poland)